Nikolay Petrushin (born 4 June 1979) is a Russian ski jumper. He competed in the normal hill and large hill events at the 1998 Winter Olympics.

References

External links
 

1979 births
Living people
Russian male ski jumpers
Olympic ski jumpers of Russia
Ski jumpers at the 1998 Winter Olympics
People from Leninogorsk, Russia
Sportspeople from Tatarstan